Prunum pruinosum is a species of sea snail, a marine gastropod mollusk in the family Marginellidae, the margin snails.

Description

Distribution
P. pruinosum can be found in Caribbean waters, ranging from Campeche to the Virgin Islands and Nicaragua.

References

Marginellidae
Gastropods described in 1844